Polylepis tomentella, known in its native habitat by the Spanish common name queñoa de altura (polylepis or quenoa of [high] altitude), is a short tree or shrub which is found in small, scattered groupings along the mountainous borders of Bolivia, Chile, and Peru (Western Cordillera), growing in soil formed by volcanoes. Populations may also be present in Argentina, but this is unconfirmed.

Sources

tarapacana
Trees of Bolivia
Trees of Chile
Trees of Peru
Páramo flora
Near threatened flora of South America
Plants described in 1891
Taxonomy articles created by Polbot
Taxobox binomials not recognized by IUCN